International Building may refer to any of the following buildings:
 601 California Street in San Francisco
 International Building (Rockefeller Center) in New York City
 International Building (Toronto)